The Misleading Widow (1919) is a silent film comedy directed by John S. Robertson and starring Billie Burke. The film is based on the play Billeted by F. Tennyson Jesse and H. M. Harwood and was produced by Famous Players-Lasky and distributed by Paramount Pictures.

As it is not known whether the film currently survives, it is likely that it, similar to most of Burke's silent films, is a lost film.

Plot

As summarized in an adaptation published in the September 1919 issue of Shadowlands, Betty Taradine, who lives in a British village near an army base, was abandoned by her husband for her spendthrift ways. She reports that he is dead to obtain insurance money. Later, British officer Captain Peter Rymill is assigned to be billeted at her house, but he turns out to be her husband living under an assumed name. There are various romantic triangles involving other villagers, and the identity of the missing husband and existence of the marriage is revealed after a dinner with the guests gathered in the widow's bedroom.

The setting of the film is in England as the Third Amendment to the United States Constitution prohibits the quartering of soldiers in a person's home without their consent.

Cast
Billie Burke - Betty Taradine
James Crane - Captain Peter Rymill
Frank R. Mills - Colonel Preedy (*this Frank Mills, a stage actor died 1921)
Madelyn Clare - Penelope Moon (billed  Madeline Clare)
Fred Hearn - Reverend Ambrose Liptrott
Mrs. Priestly Morrison - Tabitha Liptrott (*aka Mary Florence Horne)
Fred Esmelton - Mr. MacFarland
Dorothy Walters - Rose

See also
List of lost films

References

External links

The Misleading Widow; allmovie.com
The Misleading Widow theatrical release poster(Wayback Machine)

1919 films
American silent feature films
Famous Players-Lasky films
Films directed by John S. Robertson
American black-and-white films
American films based on plays
Silent American comedy films
1919 comedy films
Films set in England
1910s American films